Palmoli is a comune and town in the province of Chieti, Abruzzo, south-eastern Italy.

See also
Castello marchesale

References

 
Cities and towns in Abruzzo